is a railway station in Kokurakita-ku, Kitakyushu, Japan, operated by Kyūshū Railway Company (JR Kyushu).

Lines
Nishi-Kokura Station is served by the Kagoshima Main Line and Nippō Main Line.

Adjacent stations

Passenger statistics
In fiscal 2016, the station was used by an average of 5,361 passengers daily (boarding passengers only), and it ranked 34th among the busiest stations of JR Kyushu.

See also
 List of railway stations in Japan

References

External links

  

Railway stations in Fukuoka Prefecture
Buildings and structures in Kitakyushu
Railway stations in Japan opened in 1974